Buffalo Township is the name of some places in the U.S. state of Pennsylvania:
Buffalo Township, Butler County, Pennsylvania
Buffalo Township, Perry County, Pennsylvania
Buffalo Township, Union County, Pennsylvania
Buffalo Township, Washington County, Pennsylvania

See also 
 East Buffalo Township, Union County, Pennsylvania
 North Buffalo Township, Armstrong County, Pennsylvania
 South Buffalo Township, Armstrong County, Pennsylvania
 West Buffalo Township, Union County, Pennsylvania

Pennsylvania township disambiguation pages